The Stuart ministry was the 20th ministry of the Colony of New South Wales, and was led by Sir Alexander Stuart. Stuart was elected to the New South Wales Legislative Assembly in 1874.

The title of Premier was widely used to refer to the Leader of Government, but not enshrined in formal use until 1920.

There was no party system in New South Wales politics until 1887. Under the constitution, ministers in the Legislative Assembly were required to resign to recontest their seats in a by-election when appointed. Such ministerial by-elections were usually uncontested and on this occasion a poll was required for East Sydney where George Reid was easily re-elected and Newtown where Henry Copeland was narrowly defeated. Copeland was able to return to the assembly the following week due to a vacancy at East Sydney. The 6 other ministers, Sir Alexander Stuart (Illawarra), George Dibbs (St Leonards), Henry Cohen (West Maitland), James Farnell (New England), Francis Wright (Redfern) and Joseph Abbott (Gunnedah ), were re-elected unopposed. The minister subsequently appointed, William Trickett (Paddington) was also re-elected unopposed.

In January 1884 the Committee of Elections and Qualifications held that an error in the drafting of the constitution meant that George Reid could not be validly appointed Minister of Public Instruction, and declared his seat vacant. Reid was defeated in the resulting by-election in February 1884.

This ministry covers the period from 5 January 1883 until 6 October 1885. Suffering a paralytic stroke whilst in office, William Dalley was acting Premier from late 1884, with Dalley deciding to send a contingent of troops to the Sudan. Stuart resumed his duties in May 1885 before resigning in October due to continued ill health. His Treasurer, George Dibbs, succeeded Stuart as Premier.

Composition of ministry

Ministers are members of the Legislative Assembly unless otherwise noted.

See also

Self-government in New South Wales
Members of the New South Wales Legislative Assembly, 1882–1885
Members of the New South Wales Legislative Council, 1882–1885

References

 

New South Wales ministries
1883 establishments in Australia
1885 disestablishments in Australia